Tunde Alabi-Hundeyin (aka Dudu, born 6 June 1953) is a Nigerian television and film producer, director and screenwriter. He is the founder/CEO of Dudu Productions, the television production company which produced the first commercial music video in Nigeria. He has since produced a number of Nigerian music acts, including Sir Shina Peters, Sonny Okosun, Majek Fashek, Onyeka Onwenu and K1 De Ultimate. He produced and directed box office hits like Iyawo Alhaji and Ami Orun, including Ireke Onibudo, which predates Nigeria's Nollywood.

Early life 
Alabi-Hundeyin was born in Abeokuta to Julius Alabi Hundeyin and Anike Erinoso. He attended Comprehensive High School, Aiyetoro. He studied political science at the University of Ibadan though he took electives from theatre arts, where he spent most of his time. He also studied for a degree in advanced television techniques at CBN University in Virginia Beach, USA (now Regent University) in 1986.

Career 
Alabi-Hundeyin began acting in 1974. He played the role of Agbako in Oke Langbodo written by Chief Wale Ogunyemi. The role earned him fame among friends and lecturers including, professor Dapo Adelugba, Kole Omotosho and Sumbo Marinho. During his National Youth Service in Rivers State, he led the state's musical troupe to the Second World Black and African Festival of Arts and Culture (FESTAC 77) in Lagos.

Television 
After graduation from University of Ibadan, Alabi-Hundeyin was employed as a pioneer staff at Ogun State Television (OGTV) in 1981, having been transferred from the state Ministry of Information. He rose to become the controller of programmes, produced and directed several dramas under OGTV's Telly Drama weekly episodes, including Ireke Onibudo (1983), written by D. O. Fagunwa on 35-mm film. In 1989, he resigned to start Dudu Productions.

Music videos 
He produced his first music video for Terra Kota, the pioneer reggae artist in Nigeria, in 1987. In 1989, he was approached by Dean Disi, a PR manager, to produce a music video for CBS Records, which later became Sony Music. He produced Sir Shina Peters' Ace album, regarded as the first commercial music video in Nigeria.
 Sir Shina Peters (Ace, Shinamania, Dancing Time, and Experience)
 Majek Fashek (I & I Experience)
 Mike Okri (Concert Fever and Rhumba Dance)
 Funmi Adams (All We Need is Love)
 Adewale Ayuba (Mr Johnson Play for Me, Buggle D, and Acceleration).

Alabi-Hundeyin later produced for Polygram Records/Premier Music and EMI/Ivory music. Other artistes he worked with include Ras Kimono, Orits Wiliki, Evi Edna Ogholi, Christy Essien Igbokwe, Sonny Okosun, The Mandators, K1 De Ultimate, Sikiru Ayinde Barrister, Onyeka Onwenu, Alex O, Peterside Ottong and Blackky. His work influenced the iconography of an entire generation of reggae, pop, jùjú and fuji music in the 1990s entertainment industry in Nigeria.

Film 
In 1994, he produced Iyawo Alhaji which starred Jide Kosoko, Toun Oni, Alade Aromire and K1 De Ultimate), which was a box office hit at the cinemas between 1994 and 1996 when it was released into the home video market. During public holidays, it attracted large crowds of people who thronged, pushed and attacked one another just to see the film on the big screen. It was the first Nigerian film to gross one million naira in ticket sales at the National Arts Theatre, the largest and most prestigious cinema in Nigeria at the time. Iyawo Alhaji was the first commercial video film to be censored by the newly established Nigerian Film and Video Censors Board (NFVCB) in 1994. It was a regular practice for Alabi-Hundeyin's films, including his next, Ami Orun (1996) (starring Sola Fosudo, Clarion Chukwura-Abiola), to have extended days at the film theatre as crowds could not get tickets to watch during the initially advertised dates. He directed Abiona (1996), produced by Rolake Odetoyinbo, and Lagbondoko (1997), produced by Kayode Soyinka and starring Dele Odule.

In 1983, at the age of 30, he directed Ireke Onibudo produced by Bayo Aderohunmu's Benton Films and starring Akin Ogungbe, a veteran actor, making him one of the youngest Nigerians to have filmed on celluloid. In this period of the Nigerian film industry, only three directors had made celluloid films (Ola Balogun - Ajani Ogun; Ija Ominira; Orun Mooru; and Aiye, Hubert Ogunde and Freddie Goode - Jaiyesimi & Aropin N'Tenia).

It was reported that the best scene he ever filmed was in Ireke Onibudo. Charles Olumo (Agbako) who played Olodumare (the Voice of Wisdom) in Ireke Onibudo, had climbed a very steep hill in a jungle for a low angle silhouette shot, while Tunde Kelani, the cinematographer, and Alabi-Hundeyin had set up the camera by 5 am at the foot of the hill. By sunrise, the actor, wearing a long white robe with a dropping white beard, spread out his arms in the air while off-camera the production manager, Segun Akpata, and the art director, Pat Nebo, threw up white doves behind him. The doves rose up behind Olodumare, all flying around and away until one flew around his head and descended on his outstretched hand. The scene was so heavenly that it elicited a standing ovation every time at the cinemas.

"Benton's celluloid rehash of Ireke Onibudo, under the direction of Tunde Alabi-Hundeyin, was a huge success and indeed a further pointer to the possibilities of locally produced films," argues Tunde Adegbola, a scholar. Jonathan Haynes, professor of English at Long Island University in Brooklyn says, "Tunde Alabi-Hundeyin's direction has flair…. He uses the full gamut of cinematic techniques and uses them expressively…."

Politics 
In 2000, Alabi-Hundeyin made a foray into politics, joining the Alliance for Democracy, and won an election as the chairman of Badagry local government in 2002.

Family 
Tunde Alabi-Hundeyin is married with five sons (Tunde II, Lekan, Tope, Sola, and Bolu) and a daughter (Sessi).

Awards 
 Best Music Video (Mike Okri's Rhumba Dance) - Nigerian Music Awards (NMA) 1991
 Best Music Video (Orits Wiliki's Heart of Stone) - Nigerian Music Awards (NMA) 1992
 Sony Music Awards, 1996
 Fame Music Awards (FMA); 1996, 1997
 The Movie Awards (THEMA), 1997
 Music Video of the Year (Sonny Okosun's Save Our Souls), 1999
 Distinguished Veteran award, Nollywood at 20 Award, 2013

References

Further reading 
 Armes, R. (2008), Dictionary of African Filmmakers, Bloomington and Indianapolis: Indiana University Press.
 Conteh-Morgan, J. & Olaniyan, T. (2004), African Drama and Performance, Bloomington and Indianapolis: Indiana University Press.
 Haynes, J. (2016), Nollywood: The Creation of Nigerian Film Genres, Chicago: University of Chicago Press.

Nigerian film directors
Nigerian music video directors
Nigerian film producers
1953 births
Living people
Nigerian television producers
University of Ibadan alumni
Regent University alumni
Nigerian media personalities
Nigerian screenwriters
Nigerian television directors
Nigerian chief executives
Nigerian businesspeople
Nigerian television personalities